Tribes is a daily half-hour soap opera that aired briefly on Fox in 1990. Created by veteran soap writer Leah Laiman, the series was targeted at a teen audience.

Overview
Laiman described Tribes as "a cross between a daytime soap opera, MTV and an after-school special." Set in Southern California, the series follows a group of teenagers and was "geared to catch the teen and pre-teen audience before they begin homework or go out for the evening." Tribes Executive Producer Dennis Steinmetz, a veteran of CBS' The Young and the Restless and The Bold and the Beautiful, said:

Noting that the show was not just for teenagers, Fox executive vice president of program development Steven Chow said, "It's about the relationship between teens and their parents". Steinmetz concurred, saying "I think anyone can watch this. The stories are universal ... We tell stories about teens which affect adults." Laiman noted that the focus of Tribes is "how children respond to what's happening in their families", citing the storyline in which a mother starts drinking to cope with her divorce. Steinmetz said of the show's "comedic moments":

Cast
 Ele Keats as Anny Kubiak
 Kim Valentine as Stacey Cox
 Lisa Lawrence as Melinda Cox
 Zero Hubbard as Daryl Johnson
 Greg Watkins as Billy Pressfield
 Patrick Day as Chris Pressfield
 Michael Aron as Peter Sego
 Scott Garrison as Matt Kubiak
 Jill Whitlow as Lorraine Delaney
 Michelle Stafford as Frankie
 Kerry Remsen as Pamela

Production
Called a "low-budget show" by Laiman, Tribes was produced "like a movie-of-the-week", and one-third of the material was shot on location. Steinmetz explained:

Laiman said of the mostly inexperienced young cast:

Noting that the series must explore potentially controversial issues to be viable, Laiman explained:

Asked about Tribes, veteran soap writer Agnes Nixon — creator of the American daytime serials One Life to Live, All My Children and Loving — commented on the concept of a teen-focused soap opera:

Broadcast
Debuting on its own stations, Fox hoped Tribes would be picked up for national syndication like its reality legal series Cops and America's Most Wanted. The soap opera was scheduled to premiere in January 1990, but a week before its debut it was pushed back to March by Fox executives who "feared that it would get lost in the competitive February ratings sweeps". Laiman, understanding of the decision and calling Fox "very conservative when it comes to advertising dollars", nonetheless noted that the delay put the series at a disadvantage. According to Laiman, most of the initial 65 episodes would be completed before the series premiere, which would not allow for the changes that might be made during production based on audience reaction to the series. She noted, "When it's on the air, you can see things and change them ... It's a problem we have to live with."

Tribes premiered on March 5, 1990 in the 6:30 p.m. time slot on the Fox-owned stations in Los Angeles, New York, Chicago, Washington, Dallas, Houston and Boston. The Los Angeles Times called it the first American youth-oriented serial drama. Originally contracted for a 13-week run, Tribes ultimately aired for 19 weeks. The series' cancellation was announced in June, and its final airdate was July 13, 1990.

References

External links
 
 Cast photo at Getty Images

1990 American television series debuts
1990 American television series endings
1990s American teen drama television series
American television soap operas
Fox Broadcasting Company original programming
Television series about teenagers
Television series by 20th Century Fox Television